The 1946 United States House of Representatives elections in Virginia were held on November 5, 1946, to determine who will represent the Commonwealth of Virginia in the United States House of Representatives. Virginia had nine seats in the House, apportioned according to the 1940 United States census. Representatives are elected for two-year terms.

Overview

Results 
Final results from the Clerk of the House of Representatives:

District 1

District 2

District 3

District 4

District 5

District 6

District 7

District 8

District 9

References

See also
 1946 United States House of Representatives elections

Virginia
1946
1946 Virginia elections